Cyrenoida is a genus of bivalves belonging to the family Cyrenoididae.

The species of this genus are found in Africa and America.

Species:

Cyrenoida americana 
Cyrenoida caloosaensis 
Cyrenoida dupontia 
Cyrenoida floridana 
Cyrenoida insula 
Cyrenoida lenticularis 
Cyrenoida panamensis 
Cyrenoida rosea

References

Cyrenoididae
Bivalve genera